is a junction passenger railway station located in Minami-ku, Saitama, Saitama Prefecture, Japan, operated by East Japan Railway Company (JR East).

Lines
Some trains continue northward to  via the Kawagoe Line and southward to  via the TWR Rinkai Line. The station is located 16.1 km from Ikebukuro Station on the Saikyo Line and 29.8 kilometers from Fuchūhommachi Station on the Musashino Line. The station identification colour for the Saikyō Line platforms is "cherry blossom".

Station layout
The station has two elevated opposed side platforms serving two tracks for the Musashino Line, and two elevated island platforms serving four tracks for the Saikyō Line. The station building is located underneath the platforms.

The station has a "Midori no Madoguchi" staffed ticket office.

Platforms

History
The station opened on 30 September 1985.

Passenger statistics
In fiscal 2019, the station was used by an average of 53,992 passengers daily (boarding passengers only). The passenger figures for previous years are as shown below.

Surrounding area
 Saitama Minami-ku Ward Office
 Lotte Urawa Factory
 Lotte Urawa Baseball Ground
 Tokyo Yakult Swallows Toda Baseball Ground

See also
 List of railway stations in Japan

References

External links

 Musashi-Urawa Station information (JR East) 
 Musashi-Urawa Station information (Saitama Prefectural Government) 

Railway stations in Saitama Prefecture
Railway stations in Japan opened in 1985
Saikyō Line
Musashino Line
Stations of East Japan Railway Company
Railway stations in Saitama (city)